Amphidromus abbasorum is a species of air-breathing tree snail, an arboreal gastropod mollusk in the family Camaenidae.

Habitat 
Amphidromus abbasorum is usually found in an arboreal habitat.

Distribution 
The distribution of Amphidromus abbasorum is restricted to South Amarasi, in West Timor, Indonesia.

Etymology 
This species is named after the Indonesian Sri Patimah and the American John Abbas, in honour of their work on terrestrial snails of Indonesia.

References 

abbasorum
Gastropods described in 2017
Fauna of Timor